Mihai Marian Aioani (born 7 November 1999) is a Romanian professional footballer who plays as a goalkeeper for Liga I club Farul Constanța.

Club career
Aioani started his senior career with Chindia Târgoviște in the second division, and recorded his debut in a 7–0 thrashing of CSM Metalul Reșița on 9 March 2016, aged 16. In the 2018–19 campaign, he became an undisputed starter as his side achieved promotion to the top tier by winning the Liga II championship. 

Aioani's first match in the former competition came on 15 July 2019, playing the full 90 minutes in a 2–2 away draw with Gaz Metan Mediaș. On 22 June 2021, he agreed to a four-year contract with fellow Liga I team Farul Constanța, being part in a swap deal which took several players in the other direction.

International career
Aioani was selected by manager Adrian Mutu in the Romania squad for the 2021 UEFA European Under-21 Championship, but did not make any appearances as his nation exited the tournament in the group stage. He was then called up to the postponed 2020 Summer Olympics, this time starting in all three matches of another group-stage exit.

Career statistics

Club

Honours
Chindia Târgoviște
Liga II: 2018–19

References

External links

Mihai Aioani at Liga Profesionistă de Fotbal 

Living people
1999 births
People from Dâmbovița County
People from Buftea
Romanian footballers
Association football goalkeepers
Liga I players
Liga II players
AFC Chindia Târgoviște players
FCV Farul Constanța players
Romania youth international footballers
Romania under-21 international footballers
Olympic footballers of Romania
Footballers at the 2020 Summer Olympics